Torgeir Byrknes, better known by his stage name Teebee, is a Norwegian DJ and producer of drum and bass. He also runs the record label Subtitles Recordings. Teebee began DJing in 1990 and released his first record in 1996. He won the Knowledge Magazine award for Best International Producer in 2001.

Musicology

Teebee's music is characterised by a strong dark and futuristic science fiction influence. TeeBee material could be classed as neurofunk or techstep, although possessing a deeper ambient and atmospheric quality than much of this subgenre. His early work in particular owes an acknowledged stylistic debt to Photek, and he was initially mostly associated with the Certificate 18 record label, alongside Photek, Klute and fellow Norwegian Polar.  Following the folding of Cert 18 to enable the owner to release other genres of music, he, along with Polar, created the label Subtitles.

Teebee moved on to incorporate eclectic/experimental sounds into his music, mixing diverse samples into his tunes, such as China's Wong Fei Hung theme, "On the General's Orders".  Working with UK producer Calyx, the duo have finished their first album entitled "Anatomy" on the newly formed label "Momentum Music". Tracks from this album have been smashed globally and include "Telepathy" and "Warrior".

Discography

Albums 

 Black Science (with Polar as K) (1999)
 Black Science Labs (2000)
 Travel in Silence EP|Subtitles (2001)
 Through the Eyes of a Scorpion (2001)
 The Legacy (2004)
 Anatomy (with Calyx, Momentum Music 2007)
 All or Nothing (with Calyx, RAM Records 2012)
"1x1" (Calyx & Teebee) RAM Records 2016
Plates (Calyx & Teebee) Ram Records 2022

DJ Mixes 

 DJ TeeBee & K Present: The Deeper Side of Drum and Bass (2001)
 Carpe Diem (2006)
 Subliminal (2006)
 FabricLive.76 (2014)

External links
 
 
 https://www.facebook.com/CalyxTeeBee

Drum and bass musicians
Norwegian electronic musicians
RAM Records artists